Zophodia phryganoides is a species of snout moth in the genus Zophodia. It was described by Francis Walker in 1857. It is found on Hispaniola.

The forewings are heavily suffused with black-grey marks and patches. The hindwings are light grey in females and almost completely white in males. There are at least two generations per year.

The larvae feed on Platyopuntia and Consolea species. They feed in the stem of their host plant. The larvae are creamy white or light buff, with jet black markings. Pupation takes place in a large, light brown cocoon between or under the pear segments, or among the long spines on the trunk of their host plant.

References

Moths described in 1857
Phycitini